Harold "Harry" Wright (born 5 April 1900) was an English professional footballer  of the 1920s. Born in Staveley, he joined Gillingham from Welbeck Colliery in 1920 and went on to make 33 appearances for the club in The Football League, after which he returned to the colliery team. In 1922, he joined Bradford City, where he played for five years before joining Staveley Town in November 1927.

References

1900 births
English footballers
People from Staveley, Derbyshire
Footballers from Derbyshire
Gillingham F.C. players
Bradford City A.F.C. players
English Football League players
Year of death missing
Association footballers not categorized by position